Pelecorhynchus is a genus of flies from the family Pelecorhynchidae. The adults mostly feed on nectar of Leptospermum flowers. Larvae have been collected in the damp margins of swamp areas, where they feed on earthworms.

Distribution
They are mostly known from Australia & Chile.

Species
Pelecorhynchus albolineatus Hardy, 1918
Pelecorhynchus biguttatus (Philippi, 1865)
Pelecorhynchus claripennis Ricardo, 1910
Pelecorhynchus deuqueti Hardy, 1920
Pelecorhynchus distinctus Taylor, 1918
Pelecorhynchus elegans (Philippi, 1865)
Pelecorhynchus eristaloides (Walker, 1848)
Pelecorhynchus eristaloides var. montanus Hardy, 1916
Pelecorhynchus fascipennis Mackerras & Fuller, 1942
Pelecorhynchus fergusoni Hardy, 1939
Pelecorhynchus flavipennis Ferguson, 1921
Pelecorhynchus fulvus Ricardo, 1910
Pelecorhynchus fusconiger (Walker, 1848)
Pelecorhynchus hualqui Llanos & González, 2015
Pelecorhynchus igniculus Hardy, 1918
Pelecorhynchus interruptus Mackerras & Fuller, 1942
Pelecorhynchus kippsi Mackerras & Fuller, 1942
Pelecorhynchus kroeberi (Lindner, 1925)
Pelecorhynchus lineatus Mackerras & Fuller, 1942
Pelecorhynchus longicauda (Bigot, 1857)
Pelecorhynchus lunulatus Mackerras & Fuller, 1953
Pelecorhynchus mackerrasi Daniels, 1977
Pelecorhynchus mirabilis Taylor, 1917
Pelecorhynchus nebulosus Mackerras & Fuller, 1942
Pelecorhynchus nero Mackerras & Fuller, 1942
Pelecorhynchus niger Mackerras & Fuller, 1942
Pelecorhynchus nigripennis Ricardo, 1910
Pelecorhynchus occidens Hardy, 1933
Pelecorhynchus olivei Hardy, 1933
Pelecorhynchus penai Pechuman, 1967
Pelecorhynchus personatus (Walker, 1848)
Pelecorhynchus rubidus Mackerras & Fuller, 1942
Pelecorhynchus simplex Mackerras & Fuller, 1942
Pelecorhynchus simplissimus Mackerras & Fuller, 1942
Pelecorhynchus taeniatus Mackerras & Fuller, 1942
Pelecorhynchus tigris Daniels, 1977
Pelecorhynchus tillyardi Taylor, 1918
Pelecorhynchus toltensis Llanos & González, 2015
Pelecorhynchus vulpes (Macquart, 1850)
Pelecorhynchus xanthopleura (Philippi, 1865)

References

Tabanoidea genera
Diptera of Australasia
Diptera of South America
Taxa named by Pierre-Justin-Marie Macquart
Pelecorhynchidae